Alsace First (EZ; , ADA), formerly the Alsatian Regionalist Movement from 1998 to 2002, is a political party based in Alsace, France, established in 1989. It promotes autonomy for Alsace in France.

The party is considered far-right by many observers due to its strong stance against immigration, its opposition to Turkish entry into the European Union and its affirmation of an Alsatian national identity. The party is opposed to French centralizing Jacobin attitudes and favours decentralization, fiscal and political autonomy for Alsace, and bilingualism in the region (Alsatian and French). It is often compared to the stronger Lega Nord in Italy.

In the 2004 French regional elections, the party won 9.42% of the vote but failed to win seats. It had 9 seats in the Alsace regional council from 1998 to 2004 due to an electoral system more favourable to smaller parties than the current system, adopted in 2003. The party has one seat in the Haut-Rhin general council, held by Christian Chaton in the canton of Sainte-Marie-aux-Mines.

The leader of ADA is Jacques Cordonnier, who replaced Robert Spieler in 2008. Spieler had been a National Front deputy in the French National Assembly between 1986 and 1988.

See also
Unser Land
Alemannic separatism
List of political parties in France

Political parties of the French Fifth Republic
Far-right political parties in France
Political parties in Alsace
Alsace independence movement
Identitarian movement in France